The (Old) Jaro Municipal Hall (Spanish: Municipio de Jaro) is a heritage building which previously served as the seat of government of the former city of Jaro in Iloilo province.

History

Construction and use
The Old Municipal Hall was built by the Demetrio Ledesma, who was the presidente municipal of Jaro which was then a separate administrative unit from Iloilo City. In 1933, the building was under construction and was completed in 1934. In 1941, Jaro was absorbed into Iloilo City which meant that the building no longer functions as a municipal hall. It was then used as the headquarters of Jaro's police and the Jaro Health Center and Jaro Fire Station would be built besides the building.

In 2014, the Iloilo City Council approved an ordinance that donated the building to the National Museum of the Philippines so that the organization can use the building as a regional office. In 2017, the National Museum moved to the building and established a satellite office for Region 6 (Western Visayas). The National Museum also uses the building as a site for its training, conferences, seminars and other services.

Architecture
Juan Arellano is the architect of the Art deco building.

Heritage designation
Iloilo City lone district representative Jerry Treñas authored the Republic Act 1055 or the "An Act Declaring the Jaro Cathedral, Molo Church, The Iloilo City Central Business District, Fort San Pedro, Jaro Plaza Complex, Molo Plaza Complex and Plaza Libertad Complex" which declared historic sites in Iloilo City which includes the former municipal hall as part of a Cultural Heritage Tourism Zone. This led to the restoration of the building. After the rehabilitation efforts of the building was completed, the National Museum of the Philippines declared the site as an "Important Cultural Property" on February 17, 2017.

Gallery

References

Buildings and structures in Iloilo City
Buildings and structures completed in 1934
City and municipal halls in the Philippines
Office buildings in the Philippines
National Museum of the Philippines
Defunct police stations
1934 establishments in the Philippines
20th-century architecture in the Philippines